Leipzig Bayerischer Bahnhof (Leipzig Bavarian station) is Germany's oldest preserved railway station, located in Leipzig, Germany, in the southeastern part of the district Mitte. The station was first opened in 1842 for the Leipzig–Hof railway by the Saxon-Bavarian Railway Company, later taken over by the Royal Saxon State Railways (Königlich Sächsische Staatseisenbahnen) and operated as the Saxon-Bavarian State Railways (Sächsisch-Bayerische Staatseisenbahn).

The station was closed in 2001 for the construction of the Leipzig City Tunnel. It re-opened on 15 December 2013 after the completion of the tunnel. Since then it has been integrated into S-Bahn Mitteldeutschland system. The new station is built directly underneath the site of the former station.

The buildings on the west side of the station were renovated in 1999 and are now used by the Bayerischer Bahnhof Gose Brewery and Gasthaus.

Train services
Leipzig Bayerischer Bahnhof station is served by seven of the ten S-Bahn Mitteldeutschland lines. Planners hope that the high frequency service and fast journey times will increase passenger capacity on the city's public transport and thus relieve road traffic in the city.

The following services currently call at the station:

References

External links
 
 
 City Tunnel website

Bayerischer
Leipzig Bayerischer
Leipzig Bayerischer
Leipzig Bayerischer